Barbara Noah (born 1949) is an artist who currently works with digital prints and mixed media, with past work in public art, photography, painting, print, and sculpture.

Early life and education 
Barbara Noah earned a bachelor's degree in art from Mills College, where she graduated Phi Beta Kappa. She has later earned an M.F.A. degree, in painting and serigraphy from Pratt Institute.

Career 
Noah is an artist working on hybrid works (painting, print, photography, digital art, sculpture, installations, public art) who has exhibited in venues such as the San Francisco Museum of Modern Art, and the Kala Art Institute.

Noah teaches at the University of Washington, Bothell. She teaches Interdisciplinary Art, including classes about concepts and process/maker skills in painting, drawing, and hybrid works that combine conceptual and cultural influences. These include possible mixtures of painting, drawing, sculptural components, found objects and materials, assemblage, collage, and other media. She also teaches classes based on concepts like social justice, humor, the narrative, and creativity.

Work 
Her most recent series, Toss and Turn, was recently exhibited in a solo show at Davidson Galleries in Seattle. The artist describes it as "an ironically titled series of digital pigment prints contemplating climate change and reflecting a personal and cultural desire for transcendent experiences and survival expressed through metaphoric figurative surrogates in terrestrial and distant skies".

Exhibitions 
 2019 Toss and Turn, solo exhibition at Davidson Galleries, Seattle, Washington
 2018 Making Our Mark, Bellevue Arts Museum, Washington; curated by Michael W. Monroe, Director Emeritus of BAM, Curator-in-Charge of the Renwick Gallery, Smithsonian American Art Museum.
 2017 Second Annual Fine Art Exhibition, Los Angeles Center of Photography, Los Angeles, California
 2017 Everyone's in 3D, The Alice Gallery, Seattle, Washington
 2016 Pressing On, Seattle Print Arts Exhibit, Schack Arts Center, Everett, Washington
 2015 Fly Me to the Moon, Solo Exhibition at Palazzo Pio, University of Washington Rome Center, Rome, Italy
 2015 Print + Paper, Bellevue College; juried by Margaret Bullock, Curator of Collections and Special Exhibitions, Tacoma Art Museum
 2014 Solo Exhibition, Art & Soul, Seattle, Washington
 2013 CoCA Collision, Center On Contemporary Art, Seattle, Washington
 2010 Solo Exhibition, Davidson Galleries, Seattle, Washington
 2008 Smoke and Mirrors, Seattle Art Museum, curated by Marisa Sanchez, Assistant Curator of Modern & Contemporary Art
 2007 Print!, Seattle Print Art 3rd Biennial, juried by Sarah Suzuki, Asst. Curator, Dept of Prints, Museum of Modern Art, NY; at University of Puget Sound, Tacoma, WA
 2006 Imprimo, Gallery 110, Seattle, Washington; selected by James Elaine, Curator of Project Series, Hammer Museum, Los Angeles, California
 2005 Shenzhen Art Institute Gallery, Shenzhen, China
 2005 North By Northwest: Works On Paper from Seattle Print Arts, Kala Art Institute, Berkeley, California
 2003 SPA @ SPU, a Juried Print Exhibition; Juror: David Kiehl, Curator of Prints, Whitney Museum of American Art; Art Center Gallery, Seattle Pacific University, Seattle, Washington

Awards and nominations 
2011 Irving and Yvonne Twining Humber Award for Lifetime Artistic Achievement, Artist Trust
2007 Residency at Kala Institute, Berkeley, California
2004 City Artists Award, Office of Arts and Cultural Affairs, City of Seattle
1997 Pollock-Krasner Grant, for exceptional quality of work and artistic achievement

References

Further reading 

American women sculptors
Mills College alumni
Pratt Institute alumni
University of Washington Bothell faculty

1949 births
Living people